Borhan Abu Samah (30 November 1964 – 29 October 1999) was a Singaporean footballer who played for the Singapore national team in the 1990s.

He was a left-back best known for his hard-tackling and "bulldog" style of play, earning himself the nickname of the "Russian Tank". He made his international debut against Indonesia on 4 April 1987. He was part of the Pahang squad which won the Malaysian League and Malaysia Cup double in the 1992 FAM League season. He achieved the double again playing for the Singapore Lions in 1994.

Borhan died of liver cancer on 29 October 1999, at the age of 34.

References

1964 births
1999 deaths
Singaporean footballers
Singapore international footballers
Singapore FA players
Expatriate footballers in Malaysia
Geylang International FC players
Association football fullbacks
Southeast Asian Games silver medalists for Singapore
Southeast Asian Games bronze medalists for Singapore
Southeast Asian Games medalists in football
Competitors at the 1989 Southeast Asian Games